Íñiguez is a surname. Notable people with the surname include:

Garcia Iñiguez, king of Pamplona from 851/852 to his death in 882
Ismael Íñiguez (born 1981), Mexican football player
Juan Sandoval Íñiguez (born 1933), cardinal of the Roman Catholic Church
Ladrón Íñiguez (died 1155), nobleman of the Kingdom of Navarre during the reign of García Ramírez (1134–50)
Lope Íñiguez (1050–1093), the second Lord of Biscay from 1078
Martina Iñíguez, Argentinian writer

See also
Calixto García Íñiguez Stadium, multi-use stadium in Holguín, Cuba

Spanish-language surnames
Surnames of Spanish origin
Patronymic surnames